The 1901–02 Yale Bulldogs men's ice hockey season was the 7th season of play for the program.

Season
For the fourth consecutive season Yale was the Intercollegiate Hockey Association champion. They finished undefeated in league play and defeated Harvard in the championship series.

The team did not have a coach, however, C.H. Baxter served as team manager.

Roster

Standings

Schedule and Results

|-
!colspan=12 style="color:white; background:#00356B" | Regular Season

References

Yale Bulldogs men's ice hockey seasons
Yale
Yale
Yale
Yale